Darchmezzine, Dar Chmizzine, is a Lebanese local authority which is located in Koura District, an administrative division of North Lebanon Governorate. The municipality is member of the Federation of Koura Municipalities.

Geography 
Darchmezzine is located south of the town of Amioun and approximately 80 kilometers away north-northeast of Beirut. Situated between the sea and the mountains, Darchmezzine is characterized by a quiet rural atmosphere, a distinctive scenic view and a moderate Mediterranean climate. The area is rich of olive trees and orchards.

References

External links
 Dar Chmizzine, Localiban

Maronite Christian communities in Lebanon
Eastern Orthodox Christian communities in Lebanon
Populated places in the North Governorate
Koura District